Veksø station is a station on the Frederikssund radial of the S-train network in Copenhagen, Denmark. It is located to the south of the town of Veksø.

The station was designed by Simon Peter Christian Bendtsen. He has also designed some other stations such as: Herlev, Måløv and Ølstykke.

History 
On 5 June 1879, the first train rolled into the station. On 15 June 1879, it was inaugurated.

Services

References

S-train (Copenhagen) stations
Railway stations opened in 1989
Railway stations in Denmark opened in the 20th century